Floris Van der Haer, also known as Florentius Haracus, (1547–1634) was a clergyman from the Habsburg Netherlands and an author of historical works.

He was born in Leuven in 1547 to a family from Utrecht. As a clergyman he was attached first to St. Gertrude's Abbey, Leuven, and later to a canonry in Lille, where he died on 6 February 1634.

Works
 De initiis tumultuum Belgicorum (Douai, Jan Bogard, 1587; reissued Leuven, Judocus Coppens, 1640)
 Antiquitatum liturgicarum arcana (Douai, Balthazar Bellerus, 1605)
 Les chastelains de Lille, leur ancien estat, office et famille (Lille, Christophe Beys, 1611)

References

1547 births
1634 deaths
Clergy from Leuven
Writers from Lille
Writers from Leuven